Naheed Akhtar (also spelled Nahid Akhtar) is a Pakistani playback singer. She is tagged as the "Nightingale of Pakistan". She was the top Lollywood playback singer during the second half of 70s and 80s. She won 3 Nigar Awards and a Pride of Performance in 2007.

Early life and family
Akhtar was born on September 26, 1956, in Multan, Punjab. She has 3 sisters and 4 brothers. A sister of her, Hameeda Akhtar, was also a singer.

Singing career
Nahid's career began in 1970 when she sang a duet with Khalid Asghar in "Raag Malhar" at Radio Pakistan Multan. She has recorded songs in a range of styles, including Pakistani film music, pop, Ghazal, traditional Pakistani classical music, Punjabi folk songs, Qawwalis, Naat & Hamds & Others. She was first discovered for films by veteran music director M. Ashraf in the mid-1970s who pursued her to sing in films. She had no well-known person as ustad (teacher) to train her musically but music director M. Ashraf played a key role in grooming her talent. Her inaugural film "Nanha Farishta" was released in 1974 and in the same year she sang songs in film Shama (1974). Initially it was said in the film circles that she was introduced to fill the vacuum of Runa Laila who had migrated to Bangladesh. But later people realized that she had her own original singing style. She was active in the Pakistani film industry all the way through the 1980s.
As a playback singer, Naheed has given her voice to 590 songs in 436 Urdu and Punjabi films.

Personal life
Nahid left singing in 1986. Later, she married a journalist Asif Ali Pota in 1994. Both had a daughter and a son together. Pota died of cardiac arrest in 2017.

Later appearances
Naheed Akhtar made an appearance on stage in 2013, after repeated requests of the management of a TV show, where active and popular singers like Shabnam Majeed and Saima Jahan sang her songs to pay tribute to her.

Popular songs
A list of Nahid's popular songs includes:

Films
  "Aisay Mousam Mein Chup Kyun Ho",1974 (Film: Shama - Urdu): Singer(s): Naheed Akhtar, Music: M. Ashraf, Poet: Taslim Fazli
  "Kisi Mehrban Nay Aa Kay Meri Zindagi Saja Di", 1974 (Film: Shama - Urdu): Singer(s): Naheed Akhtar, Music: M. Ashraf, Poet: Taslim Fazli
  "Lal Lal Honto Peh, Piya Tera Naam Hay", 1975 (Film: Dil Nasheen - Urdu): Singer(s): Naheed Akhtar, Music: M. Ashraf, Poet: Masroor Anwar
  "Main Ho Gei Dildar Ki, Honay Lagi Chubban Pyar Ki", 1975 (Film: Teray Meray Sapnay - Urdu): Singer(s): Naheed Akhtar, Music: Kemal Ahmad, Poet: Younis Hamdad
  "Tut Turo Tara Tara", 1975 (Film: Mohabbat Zindgi Hay - Urdu): Singer(s): Naheed Akhtar, Music: M. Ashraf, Poet: Masroor Anwar
  "Likh Di Ham Nay, Aaj Ki Sham, Aap Ki Khatir, Aap Kay Naam", 1975 (Film: Neik Parveen - Urdu): Singer(s): Naheed Akhtar, Music: A. Hameed, Poet: Riazur Rehman Saghar
  "Yeh Dunya Rahay Na Rahay Meray Hamdam", 1975 (Film: Mera Naam Hay Mohabbat - Urdu): Singer(s): Mehdi Hassan, Naheed Akhtar, Music: M. Ashraf, Poet: Taslim Fazli
  "Dekha Jo Mera Jalwa To Dil Tham Lo Gay", 1976 (Film: Talash - Urdu): Singer(s): Naheed Akhtar, Music: Nisar Bazmi, Poet: Masroor Anwar
  "Bijli Bhari Hay Meray Ang Ang Mein", 1976 (Film: Deevar - Urdu): Singer(s): Naheed Akhtar, Music: M. Ashraf
  Pyar To Ik Din Hona Tha, Hona Tha, Ho Geya, 1976 (Film: Kharidar - Urdu): Singer(s): A. Nayyar, Naheed Akhtar, Music: M. Ashraf, Poet: Kaleem Usmani
  "Teray Siva Dunya Mein Kuch Bhi Nahin", 1976 (Film: Shabana - Urdu): Singer(s): Naheed Akhtar, Music: M. Ashraf, Poet: Taslim Fazli
  "Jis Tarf Ankhon Uthaun, Teri Tasvira Hay", 1976 (Film: Surayya Bhoopali - Urdu): Singer(s): Mehdi Hassan, Naheed Akhtar, Music: Nashad, Poet: Saifuddin Saif
  "Sathi Mujay Mil Geya, Mil Geya Mil Geya, Rasmon Ko Toren Gay", 1977 (Film: Jasoos - Urdu): Singer(s): A. Nayyar, Naheed Akhtar, Music: Tafu, Poet: Fyaz Hashmi
  "Baant Raha Tha Jab Khuda, Sare Jahan Ki Naimten", 1978 (Film: Nazrana - Urdu): Singer(s): Mehdi Hassan, Naheed Akhtar, Music: M. Ashraf, Poet: Qateel Shafai
  "Sahalie Ni Piar, Pyar Meinu Hoya", 1985 (Film: Mehndi - Punjabi): Singers: Nahid Akhtar, Noor Jahan, Music: Wajahat Attray

Television
 Main Noo Soda Water 
 Aati Hai Pawan Jaati hai Pawan
 Hamara Parcham Ye Piyara Parcham
 Kabhi Bindiya Hanse
 Shabe Gham Mujh Se Mil Kar
 Tumse Ulfat Ke
 Jahan Tera Naqsh e Qadam Dekhtay Hein
 Chaap Tilak Sab Chheen Li
 Do Nain Kanwal
 Zinda Rahein To kiya Hai

Radio
 Phir Chiraghe Lala Se Roshin Hue, (Kalam e Iqbal)
 Ik Kiran Muskhurati Huyi Ik Kiran, (Mili Naghma)
 Teri Umeed Tera Intezar
 Ankhein Jin Ko Dekh Na Payein
 Khushi Se Dil Ne Sahein Bewafaiyan

Filmography - Urdu films

Filmography - Punjabi films

Awards and honors

Television programmes

References

External links
 

Living people
Pakistani playback singers
Radio personalities from Lahore
Nigar Award winners
Recipients of the Pride of Performance
Pakistani women singers
Pakistani radio personalities
20th-century Pakistani women singers
1956 births
PTV Award winners
21st-century Pakistani women singers